Shuhrat Rahmonqulov (born 19 April 1971), is a former Uzbek professional footballer and coach.

Career
Rahmonqulov started playing at Navbahor Namangan in 1989 in the Soviet Second League. In 1992-1994 he played for Temiryolchi Qo'qo'n. After he moved to MHSK Tashkent, uprising club in Oliy League. He won with MHSK Tashkent Oliy League champion title in 1997 and runners-up in Uzbekistan Cup in 1995. In 1998, while playing for Navbahor he won the Uzbekistan Cup and a year later he was awarded 2nd place in the Uzbekistan Footballer of the Year nomination for best player in Uzbekistan after. On 29 August 1999 in Fergana Rahmonqulov won with Navbahor Uzbekistan Super Cup in a match against 1998 champion, Pakhtakor by 4:2. He scored the first goal of Navbahor in the 20th minute.

From 1992 to 2005 he scored 105 goals in League matches and 131 goals in Cup, national team and international club competitions. The last club he played for was Dinamo Samarqand in 2005.

International
He played 18 matches and scored 5 goals for the national team.

Managing career
After retiring, he started a coaching career. In 2010, he was appointed as coach of Pakhtakor-2. Since 2013 he is the director of sporting school related to FC Pakhtakor.

Honours

Club
MHSK Tashkent
 Uzbek League (1): 1997
 Uzbek League runner-up (1): 1995
 Uzbek Cup runner-up: 1995

Navbahor Namangan
 Uzbek Cup (1): 1998
 Uzbekistan Super Cup (1): 1999

Pakhtakor
 Uzbek League runner-up (1): 2001
 Uzbek Cup (1): 2001

Individual
 Gennadi Krasnitsky club: 134 goals
 Uzbekistan Footballer of the Year 2nd place: 1999

References

External links

1971 births
Living people
Soviet footballers
Uzbekistani footballers
Navbahor Namangan players
Pakhtakor Tashkent FK players
FC Nasaf players
FC Dustlik players
PFC Lokomotiv Tashkent players
FK Dinamo Samarqand players
Footballers at the 1998 Asian Games
Association football midfielders
Asian Games competitors for Uzbekistan
Uzbekistan international footballers